Diego Sánchez may refer to:
 Diego Sánchez de Badajoz (died 1549), Spanish poet and dramatist of the Renaissance
 Diego Sanchez (born 1981), American mixed martial artist
 Diego Sánchez (footballer, born 1987), Chilean football goalkeeper
 Diego Sánchez (footballer, born 1990), Spanish football forward
 Diego Sánchez (footballer, born 2003), Spanish football defender

See also
 Diego León Montoya Sánchez (born 1958/61), former Colombian crime boss leader